Show Me Your Voice is a French television mystery music game show based on South Korean programme I Can See Your Voice. It premiered on M6 on 22 April 2021.

Gameplay

Format
Presented with a group of nine "mystery singers" identified only by their occupation, a guest artist and a group of two contestants must attempt to eliminate bad singers from the group without ever hearing them sing, assisted by clues and a celebrity panel over the course of five rounds. At the end of the game, the last remaining mystery singer is revealed as either good or bad by means of a duet between them and one of the guest artists.

Rewards
If the singer is good, the contestants win ; if the singer is bad, the same amount is given to the bad singer instead.

Rounds
Each episode presents the guest artist and contestants with nine people whose identities and singing voices are kept concealed until they are eliminated to perform on the "stage of truth" or remain in the end to perform the final duet.

Production

Background and development
Development of the series began in September 2015 when Shine Group initially announced that their local adaptation of I Can See Your Voice is on the works, which did not furtherly respond from any respective broadcaster.

In February 2021, Groupe M6 was greenlit by relaunching the shelved programme and continue development after a six-year hiatus. It is produced by Warner Bros. International Television Production; the staff team is managed by director Guillaume Charles and producer Renaud Rahard.

Episodes

Guest artists

Panelists

Reception

Television ratings

Source: Médiamétrie

Notes

References

International versions of I Can See Your Voice
2020s French television series
2021 French television series debuts
French game shows
French television series based on South Korean television series
French-language television shows
M6 (TV channel) original programming